The Lords of Flatbush (stylized on-screen as The Lord's of Flatbush) is a 1974 American drama film directed by Martin Davidson and Stephen F. Verona. The film stars Perry King, Sylvester Stallone, Paul Mace and Henry Winkler. Stallone was also credited with writing additional dialogue. The plot is about street teenagers in leather jackets from the Flatbush neighborhood of Brooklyn, New York. The movie, along with the television hit Happy Days, Grease in its Broadway and film versions, and novelty rock act “Sha-Na-Na’’ was part of a resurgence in popular interest in the '50s greaser culture in the 1970s. Indeed, Henry Winkler went on to play a similar character as "The Fonz" in Happy Days.

Plot
Set in 1958, the coming of age story follows four lower middle-class Brooklyn teenagers known as The Lords of Flatbush. The Lords chase girls, steal cars, shoot pool, get into street fights, and hang out at a local malt shop. Chico attempts to win over hard-to-get, waspy Jane while throwing over easier-to-get Annie. Stanley seemingly impregnates his girlfriend Frannie, who pressures him to marry her. Stanley eventually agrees to marry even after finding out before the wedding that Frannie was never pregnant. Butchey Weinstein is highly intelligent but hides his brains behind a clownish front in order to fit in with the gang. Wimpy Murgalo is a loyal follower in awe of Stanley, eventually becoming best man at his wedding. All four boys seem to discover maturity and responsibility at the end of the film as we witness them bonding during the wedding in their dress suits, eschewing their typical leather jackets.

Cast

In addition, other notable names amongst the supporting and background performers include co-director Martin Davidson in a cameo as Mr. Birnbaum, future Academy Award–winner and disco superstar Paul Jabara as Crazy Cohen, future Golden Globe–winner Ray Sharkey as a random student and future Emmy Award–winner Armand Assante as an anonymous wedding guest.

Production

Casting
Richard Gere was originally cast as Chico but was fired due to conflicts with Stallone during rehearsals. In a 2006 interview Stallone explained:

Reception

Critical response
On Rotten Tomatoes the film has an approval rating of 64% based on reviews from 14 critics.
On Metacritic it has a score of 53 out of 100 based on reviews from 6 critics, indicating "mixed or average reviews".

Quentin Tarantino calls it "a pretty good film...the first time I was introduced to the New York independent low-budget film aesthetic."

See also
 Greaser (subculture)
 Happy Days
 List of American films of 1974
 Grease (movie)
 Grease (play and musical)

References

External links
 
 
 

1974 films
1970s coming-of-age comedy-drama films
1970s romantic comedy-drama films
American coming-of-age comedy-drama films
American gang films
American romantic comedy-drama films
Columbia Pictures films
Films directed by Martin Davidson
Films set in Brooklyn
Films set in New York City
Films set in the 1950s
Films set in 1958
Films shot in Connecticut
Films shot in New York City
1974 directorial debut films
1970s gang films
1970s English-language films
1970s American films